Luke Saville and Jordan Thompson were the defending champions but chose not to defend their title.

Sanchai and Sonchat Ratiwatana won the title after defeating Hsieh Cheng-peng and Christopher Rungkat 6–2, 6–7(5–7), [10–6] in the final.

Seeds

Draw

References
 Main Draw

Pingshan Open - Men's Doubles
Pingshan Open